Leslie Zines  (12 December 193031 May 2014) was an Australian scholar of constitutional law.

He studied law at the University of Sydney and  Harvard University and was admitted to practice in 1953. He spent over 30 years working at the Australian National University, becoming a professor in 1967. The first edition of his influential book The High Court and the Constitution was published in 1981. He appeared as junior counsel for Tasmania in the Tasmanian Dam Case, and his work was cited in the judgments of Deane J and Dawson J.

Zines became an Officer of the Order of Australia in 1992.

References

1930 births
2014 deaths
Officers of the Order of Australia
Sydney Law School alumni
Harvard Law School alumni
Australian legal scholars